At least two ships of the Imperial Russian Navy have been named General Admiral after the naval rank of General Admiral, usually that of the commander of the Russian Navy.

  - a steam frigate built in the United States launched in 1858
  - an armored cruiser launched in 1873

Russian Navy ship names